Cudlipp is a surname. Notable people with the surname include:

Hugh Cudlipp (1913–1998), Welsh journalist and newspaper editor
Percy Cudlipp (1905–1962), Welsh journalist
Reg Cudlipp (1910–2005), Welsh newspaper editor
Thelma Cudlipp (1891–1983), American artist and book illustrator